Hillbillys in a Haunted House is a 1967 American musical horror comedy film starring Ferlin Husky and Joi Lansing, and directed by Jean Yarbrough. The film is a sequel to The Las Vegas Hillbillys (1966), with Joi Lansing replacing Mamie Van Doren in the role of "Boots Malone".

Plot
A pair of country singers and their band are headed to Nashville. Their car unfortunately breaks down and they stop overnight at an abandoned house, which turns out to be haunted. A ring of international spies (Lon Chaney, Jr., Basil Rathbone and John Carradine) who live in the haunted house are seeking a top-secret formula for rocket fuel. While it is never revealed for whom they are spying, they carry out their activities under the cover of a supposed haunted house, which comes complete with a gorilla lurking in the basement.

Cast
Credits Order

Ferlin Husky as Woody Wetherby
Joi Lansing as Boots Malone
Don Bowman as Jeepers
John Carradine as Dr. Himmil
Lon Chaney Jr. as Maximillian
Linda Ho as Madame Wong
Basil Rathbone as Gregor
Molly Bee as herself
Merle Haggard as himself
Sonny James as himself
Jim Kent as himself
Biff Adam (drummer) as himself (uncredited)
Marcella Wright as herself
Richard Webb as Agent Jim Meadows
George Barrows as Anatole the gorilla
Virginia Ann Lee as Agent Ming Toy

Home media
On March 14, 2000, VCI Video released Hillbillys in a Haunted House on DVD, and later, on May 29, 2007, re-released the film, along with The Las Vegas Hillbillys, as part of a four film Hillbilly Comedy Collection.

It is also available on RiffTrax.

See also
List of American films of 1967
The Beverly Hillbillies
B movie

References

External links
 
 
RiffTrax's version on official YouTube channel

1967 films
1967 musical comedy films
1960s comedy horror films
American comedy horror films
American musical comedy films
Films directed by Jean Yarbrough
1960s English-language films
American independent films
American sequel films
American haunted house films
1967 independent films
1960s American films